Jaak Allik (born 6 October 1946) is an Estonian theatre critic, theatre director and politician. He is a member of the Social Democratic Party, and was previously the Estonian Minister of Culture 1995–1999. He was member of the VII, VIII and X Riigikogu.

Personal life
Jaak studied at the University of Tartu with a bachelor's degree in philosophy and a major in sociology and history, later working as a lecturer in that same university. He worked as a theater director and designer in the 1980s, becoming the set designer for Ugala.

As Jaak had been a part of the Estonian Communist Party since 1971 (and, ultimately, the CPSU), he became part of groups such as the Supreme Soviet and involved with notable Estonian communists such as Mikk Titma and Indrek Toome. After an independent Estonia Jaak was mainly a theater director and theater critic but still remained in politics.

Jaak Allik's parents were Communist politicians Hendrik Allik and Olga Lauristin during the 1940s. His maternal half-sister is sociologist and politician Marju Lauristin. His son, Mihkel Allik, has been an advisor to the Chancellor of Justice. His cousin is architect Vilen Künnapu.

Awards 

 Merited Artist of the ESSR (1986)
 Order of the White Star, 4th Class (2002)
 Order of the City of Viljandi (2003)

References

1946 births
Living people
Social Democratic Party (Estonia) politicians
University of Tartu alumni
Members of the Riigikogu, 1995–1999
Members of the Riigikogu, 2003–2007
Members of the Riigikogu, 2011–2015
20th-century Estonian politicians
21st-century Estonian politicians
Estonian theatre directors
Politicians from Tallinn
Recipients of the Order of the White Star, 4th Class
Estonian critics